The Woolwich Steam Packet Company (later London Steamboat Company), operated between 1834 and 1888 and offered steamer services from central London to Woolwich and later to Kent, Essex and Suffolk. One of its ships, the  sank after a collision near Woolwich with the loss of almost 700 lives in the greatest disaster in the history of British coastal cruising.

History
The company was established in 1834 with services from central London to Woolwich and along the coasts along the Thames Estuary. These were later extended to Kent and southern Essex; subsequently a London to Ipswich packet service which inaugurated calls at Clacton in 1871.

The company amalgamated with several smaller concerns, including the Watermen's Steam Packet Company, in 1876 to form the London Steamboat Company, which was the dominant force in the Thames estuary excursion business at that time.

1878 saw the greatest disaster in the history of British coastal cruising when  sank after a collision near Woolwich with the loss of almost 700 lives.

The Thames and Channel Steamship Co are understood to have been a closely associated company who sold their two steamers Vale of Clwyd and Glen Rosa to the London Steamboat Co in 1883.

The company struggled financially and was put up for sale at the end of 1884, becoming the River Thames Steamboat Company, which operated for three years. Their vessels were taken over by the Victoria Steamboat Association in time for the 1888 season.

Main Excursion Vessels

References

Defunct shipping companies of the United Kingdom
Ferry companies of England
Packet (sea transport)